Bill Warner is the pen name of Bill French (born 1941), an American anti-Islam writer, and a founder of the Center for the Study of Political Islam International based in the Czech Republic. He is a former physics professor whom the Southern Poverty Law Center in 2011 counted among a core group of ten anti-Islam hardliners in the United States.

Biography 
Warner graduated from North Carolina State University where he got his PhD in physics and mathematics in 1968. He is a former Tennessee State University physics professor. Warner does not have an academic background in religious studies. He participated in the Murfreesboro protests where he spoke to a group of opponents of the mosque and sold his books. The protests included a legal case arguing that Islam is not a religion.

Criticism 
Middlebury Institute professor and terrorism expert Jeffrey M. Bale refers to Warner as an example of writers who identify Islam with Islamism. According to Bale, these writers relate all the characteristics associated with Islamism with Islam as a whole, alleging that "such characteristics are intrinsic to Islam itself, and therefore that Islamism and jihadism are simply logical extensions - or simple applications in practice - of the authentic tenets and core values of Islam." He argues that, what they "fail to acknowledge is that these particular interpretations are by no means the only possible interpretations of core Islamic doctrines, traditions, and values, nor are they necessarily the most authentic, valid, or widely shared interpretations." This he says, is like claiming that Christian Reconstructionism is identical to Christianity.

American Muslim religious liberty lawyer Asma Uddin considers groups like Warner and his organization as anti-Muslim entities that mainstream the idea that Islam is not just a religion but also a political ideology which aids in legitimizing restricting the religious freedom of American Muslims. Warner's organization has said that “Statistics show that Islamic politics is what brought Islam success, not religion” and journalist Uddin described the organization's claim that Islam is mainly a political ideology as "pseudoscience and these quote, unquote ‘think tanks’... are responding to the work of actual legitimate think tanks using the language of statistics."

Zafar Iqbal, professor at Pakistan's International Islamic University, has compared Warner to Geert Wilders in that both consider Islam to be a totalitarian political ideology demanding complete submission. He has also been regarded as being part of the counter-jihad movement.

See also 
Political Islam

References

Bibliography 
 
 
 
 
Warner, Bill (2019). Measuring Mohammed. Center for the Study of Political Islam. .

External links

1941 births
Living people
American critics of Islam
American male non-fiction writers
American mathematicians
American physicists
Counter-jihad activists
Critics of Islamism
North Carolina State University alumni